Gelgaudiškis Manor was a former residential manor in Gelgaudiškis, Šakiai District Municipality, Lithuania.

References

Manor houses in Lithuania